Gregory Knight may refer to:
 Greg Knight, British politician, author and musician
 Greg Knight (businessman), founder and former chief executive of Welbeck Solutions
 Gregory C. Knight, United States Army officer
 Gregory Knight (cricketer), English cricketer